Ptelina is a genus of butterflies in the family Lycaenidae. The genus is endemic to the Afrotropics.

Species
Ptelina carnuta (Hewitson, 1873)
Ptelina subhyalina (Joicey & Talbot, 1921)

References

 Seitz, A. Die Gross-Schmetterlinge der Erde 13: Die Afrikanischen Tagfalter. Plate XIII 61

Poritiinae
Lycaenidae genera